Nannopterix is a genus of small primitive metallic moths in the family Micropterigidae.

Species
Nannopterix choreutes Gibbs, 2010

References

Micropterigidae
Moth genera